The Ferruccio Busoni International Piano Competition is a music competition for young pianists that takes place in Bolzano, Italy. It was founded in 1949 by Cesare Nordio in memory of the pianist and composer Ferruccio Busoni.

History 

The first Ferruccio Busoni International Piano Competition was organized by Cesare Nordio in 1949 to celebrate the 25th anniversary of the death of the pianist and composer. Arturo Benedetti Michelangeli was a supporter of the competition and was a member of the inaugural jury. Alfred Brendel won the 4th prize in this competition. For a few years a piano composition competition took place together with the piano competition.

In 1956, the young Maurizio Pollini took part in the competition, performing the Fantasia Contrappuntistica by Kenneth Leighton, which won the prize for composition; in 1957 Martha Argerich won the first prize. Other prize winners include Bruno Canino, Agustin Anievas, Joaquín Achúcarro, Jerome Rose, Garrick Ohlsson, Alberto Nosè and Wu Muye.

Members of the jury have included: Arturo Benedetti Michelangeli, Nikita Magaloff, Igor Markevitch, Carlo Maria Giulini, Garrick Ohlsson, Bruno Canino, Mario Castelnuovo-Tedesco, Paul Badura-Skoda, Rafael Orozco, Joaquín Soriano, Gerhard Oppitz, Abdel Rahman El Bacha, Michele Campanella, Leif Ove Andsnes, Adam Harasiewicz, Hiroko Nakamura, Martha Argerich, Andrzej Jasiński, Lilya Zilberstein, Tadeusz Żmudziński, Valery Afanassiev and Eliso Virsaladze.

Winners 

Complete list of winners:

References

External links

Piano competitions
Music competitions in Italy